Tibor Tary (10 August 1909 – 1945) was a Hungarian sports shooter. He competed at the 1932 Summer Olympics and 1936 Summer Olympics.

References

1909 births
1945 deaths
Hungarian male sport shooters
Olympic shooters of Hungary
Shooters at the 1932 Summer Olympics
Shooters at the 1936 Summer Olympics
Sport shooters from Budapest
20th-century Hungarian people